Antonio C. "Tony" Gilbert (born October 16, 1979) is an American football coach and former linebacker who is the inside linebackers coach for the Jacksonville Jaguars of the National Football League (NFL). He previously served as an assistant coach at the University of Central Florida, University of North Carolina at Chapel Hill, John Milledge Academy, Auburn University and the University of Georgia.

Gilbert played college football at Georgia and was drafted by the Arizona Cardinals in the sixth round of the 2003 NFL Draft. Playing for eight seasons in the NFL, Gilbert has played for the Arizona Cardinals, Jacksonville Jaguars and Atlanta Falcons.

Playing career

College
As a senior at the University of Georgia (UGA), he earned All-Southeastern Conference second-team honors and started every game at middle linebacker.  He tied for the team lead with a career-high 114 tackles and recorded 2.5 sacks, 15 stops for losses, 13 quarterback pressures, 1 forced fumble and deflected 2 passes. 
Member of Zeta Nu chapter of Phi Beta Sigma fraternity at the University of Georgia.

National Football League

Arizona Cardinals
He was drafted in the 2003 NFL Draft by the Arizona Cardinals. His two sons, Jacobi and Amir, were born the same year.

Jacksonville Jaguars
He was signed off the Cardinals practice squad in 2003 by the Jacksonville Jaguars. He played five seasons with the Jaguars before being released during final cuts on August 30, 2008.

Atlanta Falcons
Two days after his release from the Jaguars, Gilbert was signed by the Atlanta Falcons on September 1, 2008. The move reunited him with Falcons head coach Mike Smith, who was defensive coordinator for the Jaguars during Gilbert's time in Jacksonville. The Falcons released linebacker Tony Taylor to make room for Gilbert on the roster.

On December 8, Gilbert was placed on Injured Reserve due to a hamstring injury.
An unrestricted free agent in the 2009 offseason, Gilbert was re-signed by the Falcons on February 27.

Second stint with the Jacksonville Jaguars
On August 8, 2010, the Jacksonville Jaguars signed Gilbert and two other players. On September 4, 2010, Gilbert was released.

Coaching career

Georgia
Gilbert began his coaching career at the University of Georgia, his alma mater, as an assistant strength and conditioning coach in 2011.

Auburn
In 2012, Gilbert joined Auburn University as a defensive graduate assistant and assistant linebackers coach.

Georgia Military College
In 2013, Gilbert was hired by Georgia Military College as their Assistant defensive backs & linebackers coach.

John Milledge Academy
In 2014, Gilbert joined John Milledge Academy as their defensive coordinator and linebackers coach.

North Carolina
In 2015, Gilbert joined the University of North Carolina at Chapel Hill as a defensive quality control specialist & assistant linebackers coach.

UCF
In 2018, Gilbert was hired as a defensive quality control coach at the University of Central Florida (UCF).

Jacksonville Jaguars
On June 12, 2020, Gilbert was hired by the Jacksonville Jaguars as their assistant linebackers coach under head coach Doug Marrone.

On February 11, 2021, Gilbert was retained by the Jaguars under head coach Urban Meyer.

On February 17, 2022, Gilbert was retained under new head coach Doug Pederson.

References

External links
Jacksonville Jaguars coaching profile

1979 births
Living people
American football linebackers
Arizona Cardinals players
Atlanta Falcons players
Auburn Tigers football coaches
Georgia Bulldogs football coaches
Georgia Bulldogs football players
Jacksonville Jaguars coaches
Jacksonville Jaguars players
North Carolina Tar Heels football coaches
Sportspeople from Macon, Georgia
UCF Knights football coaches
African-American players of American football
African-American coaches of American football
21st-century African-American sportspeople
20th-century African-American sportspeople